The Monaghan Way is a long-distance trail in County Monaghan, Ireland. It is typically completed in three days. It is designated as a National Waymarked Trail by the National Trails Office of the Irish Sports Council and is managed by Monaghan County Council and the Monaghan Way Committee. 

The trail begins in Monaghan Town and travels east towards Castleblayney, via Castleshane and Clontibret. From Castleblayney the route passes Lough Muckno and Lough Ross before following the alignment of a disused railway line along the River Fane to reach the end at Iniskeen. 

, the trail is closed.

References

Notes

Bibliography
  
 

Geography of County Monaghan
Tourist attractions in County Monaghan
Long-distance trails in the Republic of Ireland